USS Zumbrota (SP-93/YP-93) was a motor boat in the United States Navy.

Zumbrota was built in 1914 at Port Clinton, Ohio, by the Matthews Boat Company and was acquired by the Navy on 11 August 1917 from circus entrepreneur, Charles Ringling, of Sarasota, Florida, for service as a section patrol boat and was designated SP-93.

East Coast operations
Commissioned on 11 August 1917, Zumbrota was assigned to the 7th Naval District and operated out of Key West, Florida.  She conducted local patrols for the duration of the war. Redesignated YP-93 in 1920, she continued her operations in the Florida waters of the 7th Naval District until decommissioned on 5 November 1926. Struck from the Navy List on 8 November 1926, the boat was sold to the Thompson Fish Co., of Key West, on 3 May 1927.

She is not to be confused with similarly designated USS YP-93 (ex-Margaret F) built in 1931.

Current Port
The Zumbrota currently resides in southern California as a dinner cruise vessel. It was listed on the National Register of Historic Places listings in Los Angeles County, California as of March 20, 2017.

References

External links
 
 Naval Historical Center Online Library of Selected Images: USS Zumbrota

Patrol vessels of the United States Navy
Ships built in Port Clinton, Ohio
1914 ships
Yard patrol boats of the United States Navy